Betty Eleanor Gosset Molesworth Allen  ( Molesworth, 21 July 1913 – 11 October 2002) was a New Zealand botanist. She researched and published extensively on Southeast Asian ferns, and in her retirement she discovered a fern in southern Spain that had previously been thought to be an exclusively tropical species.

Early life 
Molesworth Allen was born on 21 July 1913 in Ōpōtiki, a small town in the North Island of New Zealand. Her father, Arthur, a farmer, was the Paris-born younger son of a Cornwall rector, the 8th Viscount Molesworth. Her mother, born Nellie Maud Banks, was a friend of the suffragist Pankhursts. Molesworth Allen suffered tuberculosis, polio and cancer as a child and spent most of her childhood in hospitals and unable to attend schools. However, both her parents were passionate about nature and wildlife, particularly birds, and as a result she grew up with a love of flora and fauna.

Career 
Molesworth Allen became interested in botany through Lucy Cranwell, a botanist at the Auckland Museum. Cranwell introduced her to systematic biology and encouraged her interest in natural history. She was also influenced by John Holloway who inspired her interest in ferns. In 1939, Molesworth Allen was involved in the establishment of the Auckland Botanical Society and was its inaugural secretary. During World War II Molesworth Allen volunteered for the Women's Auxiallary Air Force, before replacing Cranwell as botanist at Auckland Museum from 1944 to 1947. In these years she made important additions to the museum's collections, including mosses and sedges and the field notebooks of T.F. Cheeseman.

In 1947 Molesworth Allen received a scholarship to study in Basel, Switzerland. Stopping over in Malaya, she met and married Geoffrey Allen; declining the scholarship in Switzerland, she instead settled in Malaya where she trained in tropical botany and worked in the Singapore Botanic Gardens. From 1948 she travelled extensively in Southeast Asia, particularly to Malaysia, Borneo and Thailand, observing plants and collecting samples from the jungles. However, her work became dangerous during the 1948–1960 State of Emergency as Communist guerillas set up camps in the jungles.

In 1963 Molesworth Allen retired to Los Barrios in Andalusia, Spain, where she continued to collect and study plants, particularly ferns. In January 1965 she discovered the fern Psilotum nudum (L.) P. Beauv. growing in Algeciras in southern Spain, which had previously been assumed to be a solely tropical species. As a result of her discovery, the area was extensively studied and eventually protected as a national park, Los Alcornocales Natural Park.

Publications

Books 
 Some Common Trees of Malaya (1957) Eastern Universities Press
 Malayan Fruits: An Introduction to the Cultivated Species (1967) D. Moore Press
 A Selection of Wildflowers of Southern Spain (1993) Santana Books

Articles 
 Some conservation problems of Malaya's hill stations in Nature Conservation in Western Malaysia (1961) Malayan Nature Society
 Limestone hills near Ipoh in Nature Conservation in Western Malaysia (1961) Malayan Nature Society
 Ferns of the Quartz Ridges in The Malayan Nature Journal Vol. 17 No. 1, April 1963
 Jelatang and Pulutus: stinging trees of Malaysia in The Malayan Nature Journal Vol. 18 No. 1, April 1964
 Descriptions of the Malayan species of Laportea in Singapore Botanic Gardens Garden Bulletin Vol. 20 (4), 1964
 Psilotum Nudum in Europe in The British Fern Gazette Vol. 9 Part 6, 1965
 Malayan Fern Notes V in Singapore Botanic Gardens Garden Bulletin Vol. 22 (1&2), 1967
 Notes on some Malayan ferns (Adiantum) in The Malayan Nature Journal Vol. 22 Part 2, March 1969
 Notes on two species of Arisarum in south-west Spain in Kew Bulletin Vol. 26 No. 1, 1971
 Observations on Spanish ferns in The British Fern Gazette Vol. 10 Part 4, 1971

Honours and recognition 
In 1988, Molesworth was made an adopted daughter of the town of Los Barrios, and a botanical park in the town was named in her honour – the Betty Molesworth Memorial Park. In 1995 she was awarded the H.H. Bloomer Award by the Linnean Society of London for her discovery of Psilotum nudum in Europe. In the 1997 Queen's Birthday Honours she was appointed an Officer of the Order of the British Empire for services to botany.

The hybrid plants Narcissus x alleniae  and Centaurea molesworthiae were named after Molesworth Allen. A part of the Gua Tempurung, the largest limestone cave in Peninsular Malaysia, is named the Molesworth Allen Tunnel after her.

Personal life 
In 1948 Molesworth Allen married Geoffrey Allen, a pilot, wildlife photographer and amateur ornithologist. They were married until his death in 1985.

Molesworth Allen died in Marbella, Spain, on 11 October 2002.

References

1913 births
2002 deaths
People from Ōpōtiki
20th-century New Zealand botanists
New Zealand Officers of the Order of the British Empire
20th-century New Zealand women scientists
New Zealand women botanists
New Zealand expatriates in Malaysia
New Zealand expatriates in Spain